This is a list of celebrities including actors, musicians, sportspeople and others who have been portrayed in video games.

References

Celebrity-related lists
+Celebrity appearances